Leontopodium discolor, known as Ezo-usuyuki-sō or Rebun-usuyuki-sō in Japan, is a species of flowering plant native to alpine areas of Hokkaidō.

Description
Leontopodium discolor is a perennial with white flowers that grows 15–30 cm in height. It is a hermaphrodite.

Status on Japanese red list
The plant is in the endangered category on the red list of threatened plants of Japan.

Ecology
Leontopodium discolor is found in alpine environments in moist stony soils and scree. Insects pollinate its flowers.  The flowers bloom from July to September.

Cultivation
Leontopodium discolor requires full sun. The soil must be moist, well-drained, and gritty. The soil can be alkaline or circumneutral as long as it is not too fertile. The plant is hardy to zone 6. In places with wet winters, it is susceptible to root rot and should be protected with a collar of grit and sheltered from the prevailing winds.

Uses
The young leaves can be eaten when cooked. Plants For A Future assigns an edibility rating of 1.

References

External links

discolor
Endemic flora of Japan
Alpine flora
Endangered plants
Plants described in 1909